I kongens klæ'r is a 1954 Danish comedy film directed by Poul Bang and starring Dirch Passer.

Cast
Dirch Passer as Søren Rask - rekrut 66
Ove Sprogøe as Jens Rasmussen - rekrut 65
Kjeld Petersen as Grosserer Johan Petersen / 67
Bodil Steen as Oline Poulsen
Louis Miehe-Renard as Premierløjtnant Henrik Grøn
Elsebet Knudsen as Elsebet Petersen
Erni Arneson as Fru Petersen
Buster Larsen as Nikolaj Hansen
Arthur Jensen as Jens Hik
Ib Schønberg as Jensen
Paul Hagen as Gadebetjent
Karl Stegger as Fængselsbetjent
Ole Monty as Militærlægen
Axel Strøbye as Sergent Thorvald Rønne
Gyrd Løfquist as Politibetjent Høegh
Carl Johan Hviid as Overbetjent Schmidt
Caja Heimann as Frk. Hansen
Carl Ottosen as Tolder
Ib Fürst as Tolder
Margrethe Nielsen as Kontordame
Mogens Juul as Skildvagt
Poul Clemmensen as Betjent
Bjørn Puggaard-Müller as Betjent
Henry Nielsen as Overbetjent Peter Kvist

External links

1954 films
1954 comedy films
1950s Danish-language films
Danish black-and-white films
Films directed by Poul Bang
Films scored by Sven Gyldmark
Danish comedy films